Elgin Public Schools is a school district in Elgin, Oklahoma.

History
School District No. 16, County of Comanche, Oklahoma Territory, was formed April 3, 1902. In June 1902 a one-story schoolhouse and other out building were constructed. A. T. Kellison was hired as the first teacher at a salary of $40 per month. By 1908, since enrollment of the school had increased to 80 pupils and 110 in 1909, it was obvious that more space was needed. Constructed of a new brick building began and the new building was occupied in the spring of 1910. The school became accredited in 1928, the first school buses began their daily route in 1935, a hot lunch program also started in 1935, and the first cafeteria begin in 1948, in a building remodeled from an army hospital. In 1937 the first edition of the Elgin Chat was distributed.

When school opened in September 1925, enrollment was 25 pupils in the high school with all the grades showing an enrollment of 70 pupils. Enrollment in 1937 had jumped to a total of 238, with 130 in high school and 108 in the grade school. During the 100 years of Elgin School's existence, the Elgin School campus continued its growth, both in student enrollment, but also in new buildings.  
The growth of the Elgin Schools is a direct compliment to the dedicated early pioneers who wanted an educated for their children and pursued that dream with the result that many of their children, grandchildren and great-grandchildren still attend the school system begun by their ancestors.

In 2002 the Elgin school system celebrated 100 years of providing education to the residents of the Elgin school district Elgin Public Schools has changed dramatically over the years.  Our school district spans 200.5 square miles. We encourage you to come by and see the growth that is happening daily at Elgin Public Schools.

Schools 
 Elgin High School

Sources

School districts in Oklahoma
Education in Comanche County, Oklahoma
School districts established in 1902
1902 establishments in Oklahoma Territory